The 2017 Dunlop World Challenge was a professional tennis tournament played on indoor hard courts. It was the 10th edition of the tournament and part of the 2017 ATP Challenger Tour and the 2017 ITF Women's Circuit. It took place in Toyota, Japan, between 13–19 November 2017 and was the last edition of the tournament.

Men's singles main draw entrants

Seeds 

 1 Rankings as of 6 November 2017.

Other entrants 
The following players received wildcards into the singles main draw:
  Shintaro Imai
  Yuta Shimizu
  Yuga Tashiro
  Jumpei Yamasaki

The following players received entry from the qualifying draw:
  Hiroyasu Ehara
  Yuya Kibi
  Kento Takeuchi
  Kaito Uesugi

Women's singles main draw entrants

Seeds 

 1 Rankings as of 6 November 2017.

Other entrants 
The following players received wildcards into the singles main draw:
  Yuka Hosoki
  Momoko Kobori
  Urszula Radwańska
  Yuuki Tanaka

The following players received entry from the qualifying draw:
  Rika Fujiwara
  Megumi Nishimoto
  Kyōka Okamura
  Aiko Yoshitomi

Champions

Men's singles

 Matthew Ebden def.  Calvin Hemery, 7–6(7–3), 6–3.

Women's singles

 Mihaela Buzărnescu def.  Tamara Zidanšek, 6–0, 6–1

Men's doubles

 Max Purcell /  Andrew Whittington def.  Ruben Gonzales /  Christopher Rungkat 6–3, 2–6, [10–8].

Women's doubles

 Ksenia Lykina /  Junri Namigata def.  Nicha Lertpitaksinchai /  Peangtarn Plipuech 3–6, 6–3, [10–4].

External links 
 2017 Dunlop World Challenge at ITFtennis.com
 Official website

Dunlop World Challenge
2017 ITF Women's Circuit
2017 in Japanese tennis
November 2017 sports events in Japan
2017